Seman Laxfield or Patener (fl. 1397–1404), of Lincoln, was an English politician.

He was Mayor of Lincoln for 1389–90 and elected a Member (MP) of the Parliament of England for Lincoln in 1397 and 1404.

References

14th-century births
15th-century deaths
English MPs September 1397
English MPs January 1404
Members of the Parliament of England (pre-1707) for Lincoln
Mayors of Lincoln, England